Ousseni Bouda (born 28 April 2000) is a Burkinabé professional footballer who plays for Major League Soccer club San Jose Earthquakes.

Bouda was the recipient of the Gatorade National Boys Soccer Player of the Year award for the 2017–18 season. The award is a nationally recognized honor given to the best high school athlete in each sport in the United States.

Career 
Born in Burkina Faso, Ousseni Bouda spent four years at the Right To Dream Academy in Ghana. He then moved to the Millbrook School in New York, and led the Millbrook Mustangs to win three straight championships in the New England Preparatory School Athletic Council tournament.  He was honored with the Gatorade National Soccer Player of the Year, a national award given to the best boy's high school soccer player. Bouda finished his high school career with 82 appearances for the Mustangs, scoring 156 goals. In his last two high school games, Bouda scored five goals in each game leading the Mustangs to win the championship.

Listed as a five-star recruit by Top Drawer Soccer, Bouda played college soccer for the Stanford Cardinal men's soccer program. He was the first Stanford soccer player to win the Gatorade High School Player of the Year Award.  On August 30, 2019, Bouda made his collegiate debut for Stanford, in a 5–0 win against Penn State. In the same match, Bouda made his first college start and scored his first college goal. On October 15, 2019 Bouda earned the Pac-12 Men's Soccer Player of the Week, being the first freshman of the season to earn the honor.  On November 20, 2019, concluding the 2019 Pac-12 Conference men's soccer season, Bouda was named the Pac-12 Freshman of the Year.

Bouda sat out the 2020 season due to injury.  In the 2021 season, he led Stanford with nine assists and five goals, and was named to the United Soccer Coaches All-Region first team and to the All-Pac-12 first team.

On January 6, 2022, Bouda was announced as one of the eight members of the 2022 Generation Adidas class ahead of the 2022 MLS SuperDraft.  Five days later, he was chosen by the San Jose Earthquakes as their first choice and the eighth overall choice in the MLS SuperDraft.

International 
Bouda is a member of the Burkina Faso senior national team. He also appeared with the Burkina Faso U-20 team in 2019.

Honors

Individual 
 Pac-12 Freshman of the Year: 2019
Pac- 12 Player of the Week (Oct. 15, 2019; Sept. 3, 2021; Oct. 4, 2021)
Gatorade High School Player of the Year: 2017–18
Top Drawer Soccer Best XI Freshman First Team:  2019
College Soccer News All – Freshman First Team: 2019
United Soccer Coaches All – Far West Region: 2019, 2021
All-PAC 12 First Team: 2019, 2021 
High School All American: 2018–2019
United Soccer Coaches All American: 2018–2019
New England Soccer Journal Player of the year: 2018–2019 
USA TODAY – ALL AMERICAN boys soccer player of the year: 2018–2019

References

External links 
 Ousseni Bouda at Stanford Athletics
 
 
 USL League Two profile

2000 births
Living people
Association football midfielders
Burkinabé footballers
Burkinabé expatriate footballers
Burkinabé expatriate sportspeople in the United States
Expatriate soccer players in the United States
MLS Next Pro players
People from Dutchess County, New York
San Jose Earthquakes draft picks
San Jose Earthquakes players
Soccer players from New York (state)
Sportspeople from the New York metropolitan area
Sportspeople from Ouagadougou
Stanford Cardinal men's soccer players
USL League Two players
21st-century Burkinabé people
Major League Soccer players
Burkina Faso international footballers